Lee Jung-yong (born July 6, 1982/1983) is a South Korean football midfielder for Sisaket FC in the Thai Premier League.

His previous clubs were Ulsan Hyundai Horang-i in the K League and NK Slaven Belupo and NK Naftaš HAŠK in Croatia.

Club stats
As of end of 2009 season

References

External links

NK Slaven Belupo results 
Stats at 1hnl.net 

1982 births
Living people
Association football midfielders
South Korean footballers
Ulsan Hyundai FC players
NK Slaven Belupo players
NK HAŠK players
Seongnam FC players
K League 1 players
Croatian Football League players
South Korean expatriate footballers
South Korean expatriate sportspeople in Croatia
South Korean expatriate sportspeople in Thailand
Expatriate footballers in Croatia
Expatriate footballers in Thailand
Yonsei University alumni
People from Mokpo